Hélder Luís Lopes Vieira Tavares (born 26 December 1989) is a professional footballer who plays as a midfielder for Romanian club FC Voluntari and the Cape Verde national team.

Club career
Born in Santa Maria dos Olivais, Lisbon of Cape Verdean descent, Tavares spent his first years as a senior in Portuguese amateur football. In the summer of 2013, aged nearly 24, he signed with S.C. Beira-Mar in the second division from C.D. Pinhalnovense in the third.

Tavares made his professional debut on 27 July 2013, playing the full 90 minutes in a 1–0 away loss against Portimonense S.C. in the first round of the Taça da Liga. He first appeared in division two on 12 August, again playing the entire match in a 2–3 home defeat to FC Porto B.

In the 2015 off-season, after one year in Romania with FC Oțelul Galați, Tavares joined Primeira Liga club C.D. Tondela. His first match in the Portuguese top tier occurred on 14 August by featuring 70 minutes in the 1–2 home loss against Sporting CP, and he finished his debut season with 30 appearances as his team managed to avoid relegation. In June 2016, he renewed his contract for another year.

In January 2019, as his link was due to expire on 30 June, Tavares was sold to Altay S.K. of the Turkish TFF First League and agreed to a one-and-a-half-year deal.

International career
Tavares made his debut for Cape Verde on 28 March 2017, in a friendly against Luxembourg.

International stats

References

External links

1989 births
Living people
Portuguese sportspeople of Cape Verdean descent
Cape Verdean footballers
Portuguese footballers
Footballers from Lisbon
Association football midfielders
Primeira Liga players
Liga Portugal 2 players
Segunda Divisão players
C.D. Pinhalnovense players
S.C. Beira-Mar players
C.D. Tondela players
Liga I players
ASC Oțelul Galați players
FC Voluntari players
TFF First League players
Altay S.K. footballers
Giresunspor footballers
Cape Verde international footballers
Cape Verdean expatriate footballers
Portuguese expatriate footballers
Expatriate footballers in Portugal
Expatriate footballers in Romania
Expatriate footballers in Turkey
Cape Verdean expatriate sportspeople in Portugal
Cape Verdean expatriate sportspeople in Romania
Cape Verdean expatriate sportspeople in Turkey